The deputy prime minister of New Zealand is the second most senior member of the Cabinet of New Zealand. The officeholder usually deputises for the prime minister at official functions. The current deputy prime minister is Carmel Sepuloni.

The role existed on an informal basis for as long as the office of prime minister/premier has existed, but the office of "deputy prime minister" was formally established as a ministerial portfolio in 1949. This means that Keith Holyoake is considered the first deputy prime minister. It was formally designated as a full cabinet level position in 1954.

Appointment and duties
Generally, the position is held by the deputy leader of the largest party, but now that the MMP electoral system makes coalitions more likely, the role may instead go to the leader of a junior party. This occurred with Winston Peters, leader of New Zealand First, and Jim Anderton, leader of the Alliance. The previous deputy prime minister, Grant Robertson of the Labour Party, had the role even though his party's deputy leader is Kelvin Davis. After the 2020 election, Davis turned down the position, and Robertson was appointed instead.

The post of deputy prime minister was formally established in 1949. Eighteen individuals have held the position (two of them doing so twice) and of those people: Holyoake, Marshall, Watt, Muldoon, Palmer, Clark and English have eventually served as prime minister. The deputy prime minister has always been a member of the Cabinet, and has always held at least one substantive portfolio.

The Deputy Prime Minister "...can, if necessary" exercise the statutory and constitutional functions and powers of the prime ministership if the Prime Minister is unavailable or unable. They can also do the same as Acting Prime Minister, in consultation with the Prime Minister if it is appropriate and practicable. The Deputy Prime Minister can also temporarily act as Prime Minister until the leadership of the government is determined in some cases, like the death or incapacity of the Prime Minister.

Little scholarly attention has focused on deputy prime ministers in New Zealand or elsewhere. In 2009, an article by Steven Barnes appeared in Political Science where nine 'qualities' of deputy prime ministership were identified: temperament; relationships with their Cabinet and caucus; relationships with their party; popularity with the public; media skills; achievements as Deputy Prime Minister; relationship with the Prime Minister; leadership ambition; and method of succession. Barnes conducted a survey of journalists, academics, and former members of parliament to rank New Zealand's deputy prime ministers since 1960. Across the nine deputy prime minister 'qualities', Don McKinnon achieved the number one ranking, followed by Brian Talboys, Michael Cullen, and John Marshall. In a second 'overall' ranking, Cullen was ranked number one, followed by Talboys, McKinnon, and Marshall. Jim Anderton, Winston Peters, and Bob Tizard were ranked lowest in both sections of the survey.

List of deputy prime ministers of New Zealand
Key

Notes

References

External links

Constitution of New Zealand
New Zealand politics-related lists
Lists of government ministers of New Zealand